Tom Connell may refer to:

 Thomas H. Connell III (1942–2010), stage manager of the Metropolitan Opera
 Tom Connell (American football), American football player
 Tom Connell (footballer) (born 1957), Northern Irish footballer